Pkhyan is a village in Namli Maira, Pakistan. It has a population of about 200.

Populated places in Abbottabad District
Villages in Pakistan